Hypericum gramineum, commonly known as small St. John's wort or grassy St. Johnswort, is species of flowering plant in the St. Johns wort family Hypericaceae. It is found in parts of Southeast Asia, Oceania, and the Pacific.

Description
Its flowers are 5–12 mm in diameter. The plant causes photosensitization and enteritis.

Distribution and habitat
Hypericum gramineum occurs in New Zealand, Australia, New Caledonia, Papua-New Guinea, Vietnam, Taiwan, China (Hainan, Yunnan), India (Meghalaya, Manipur), Bhutan, and the United States (Hawaii). It is found in every state and territory of Australia. It grows in open grassy and shrubby habitats.

Reference list

gramineum
Flora of China
Flora of East Himalaya
Flora of Assam (region)
Flora of Vietnam
Flora of Australia
Flora of New Caledonia
Flora of New Zealand
Flora of New Guinea